Miles Patrick-Anthony Byass (born December 13, 1991) is an American soccer player.

Club career

Youth and amateur
While in high school, Byass played for Arsenal Soccer Academy in Temecula, California. He was recruited by the LA Galaxy Academy program in early 2010, but quit after being told he would not be allowed to play high school soccer simultaneously. While a senior in high school Byass trained in Germany with two Bundesliga clubs.

Byass played two years of college soccer for San Diego State University and was an All-Pac-10 Conference team honorable mention.

Byass played in the USL PDL for two years, first with Orange County Blue Star in 2012 and then with Seattle Sounders FC U-23 the following year.

Finland
In early 2014, Byass signed with Finnish club FF Jaro. He made three cup appearances, scoring one goal before joining MYPA. Byass made only one cup appearance for MYPA scoring in this match, before finding stability with Ykkönen club JIPPO. He made 22 appearances for the club in 2014, scoring seven goals.

Free agency
In February 2016, Byass went on trial with Canadian NASL club Ottawa Fury.

International
While with Arsenal Soccer Academy in 2009, Byass was called up to the U.S. under-18 team for the 2009 Milk Cup. also appearing in the 2009 Australian Youth Olympics (Stats) and the 2009 Lisbon International Cup

References

1991 births
Living people
African-American soccer players
American expatriate soccer players
American soccer players
Association football forwards
Expatriate footballers in Finland
FF Jaro players
JIPPO players
Myllykosken Pallo −47 players
Orange County Blue Star players
People from Loma Linda, California
San Diego State Aztecs men's soccer players
Seattle Sounders FC U-23 players
Soccer players from California
USL League Two players
Veikkausliiga players
Ykkönen players
People from Redlands, California
Sportspeople from San Bernardino County, California
United Premier Soccer League players
National Premier Soccer League players
21st-century African-American sportspeople